Leonard Gooder (11 February 1876 – 26 November 1928) was an English cricketer. He played nineteen first-class matches for Surrey between 1901 and 1905.

See also
 List of Surrey County Cricket Club players

References

External links
 

1876 births
1928 deaths
English cricketers
Surrey cricketers
People from Paddington
Cricketers from Greater London